Ochakov or Ochakiv is a city in Ukraine.

Ochakov may also refer to:
Ochakov (crater), a crater on Mars
Russian cruiser Ochakov, a 1971 Kara-class cruiser of the Russian Navy

See also 
 Siege of Ochakov (disambiguation)
 
 Ochakovo (disambiguation), a station of the Moscow Metro